Diloma aridum is a species of small sea snail, a marine gastropod mollusc in the family Trochidae.

Description
The height of the shell attains 19 mm, its diameter 17 mm.

Distribution
This marine species is endemic to New Zealand and occurs on sheltered mid-tidal rocks.

References

 Powell A W B, New Zealand Mollusca, William Collins Publishers Ltd, Auckland, New Zealand 1979 
 Spencer, H.G.; Marshall, B.A.; Maxwell, P.A.; Grant-Mackie, J.A.; Stilwell, J.D.; Willan, R.C.; Campbell, H.J.; Crampton, J.S.; Henderson, R.A.; Bradshaw, M.A.; Waterhouse, J.B.; Pojeta, J. Jr (2009). Phylum Mollusca: chitons, clams, tusk shells, snails, squids, and kin, in: Gordon, D.P. (Ed.) (2009). New Zealand inventory of biodiversity: 1. Kingdom Animalia: Radiata, Lophotrochozoa, Deuterostomia. pp. 161–254

External links
 

aridum
Gastropods of New Zealand
Gastropods described in 1927
Taxa named by Harold John Finlay